The ChungYuet Global Business Building is a skyscraper office building located in Taoyuan District, Taoyuan, Taiwan. The building was completed in 2009, with a height of  that comprise 25 floors above ground.

As of January 2021, it is the fifth tallest building in Taoyuan City, tied with Taoyuan Water Conservancy Composite Tower.

See also 
 List of tallest buildings in Asia
 List of tallest buildings in Taiwan
 List of tallest buildings in Taoyuan City
 ChungYuet World Center
 ChungYuet Royal Landmark

References

2009 establishments in Taiwan
Skyscraper office buildings in Taiwan
Skyscrapers in Taoyuan
Buildings and structures in Taoyuan City
Office buildings completed in 2009
Neoclassical architecture in Taiwan